North Fitzroy station is a former railway station that was located on the Inner Circle railway line in Melbourne, Australia. It was located east of Nicholson Street, on Rae and Park streets. The station was opened on 8 May 1885, and was originally known as Nicholson Street.

A branch line headed south from North Fitzroy station towards Fitzroy Station. The Fitzroy branch had passenger services only until 1892, and it was thereafter used solely for goods trains. North Fitzroy station was closed to passengers in 1948, and to goods trains in 1981. Almost all traces of the station have been removed, except for some bluestone.

References 

Disused railway stations in Melbourne
Railway stations in Australia opened in 1885
Railway stations closed in 1948
Railway stations closed in 1981